Jose Marie Borja Viceral (born March 31, 1976), popularly known as Vice Ganda, is a Filipino comedian, talk show host, television presenter, actor, entrepreneur, and singer. He is a regular host on ABS-CBN's noontime variety show It's Showtime, and has starred in several films, eight of which are considered to be the highest-grossing in Philippine cinema.

Dubbed as the “Unkabogable and Phenomenal Box Office Superstar” by various media outlets, Ganda is among the most followed Filipino celebrity across all leading social media platforms. Edukcircle Awards awarded him as one of the “Most Influential Celebrity of the Decade .” CNN Philippines recognises Ganda's unrivalled consecutive blockbuster films as one of the moments that defined Pinoy pop culture in 2010s decade. Forbes Asia listed him among the Top 100 Digital Stars for being one of Asia-Pacific's Most Influential Celebrities on Social Media. In 2021, Ganda won an Asian Academy Creative Award for Best Entertainment Host.

As of 2021, Ganda's total movie gross has already reached ₱4.6 billion, becoming the Highest Grossing Actor of all time. Throughout his career, he has already won over 80 awards including the prestigious Dolphy Lifetime Achievement Award at the 66th FAMAS Awards. During his stand-up routines, Vice Ganda uses observational comedy, situational irony and sarcasm in pertaining to Filipino culture and human sexuality. He is also the first openly LGBTQ endorser for Globe Telecom. Currently, Vice Ganda is under the management of ABS-CBN, and handling him is business unit head Deo Endrinal after being managed for four years by local entertainment columnist/host, Ogie Diaz.

Early life
Before coming out to his family and loved ones, Vice Ganda was known as "Tutoy", which was his nickname as a young boy. The youngest of six children, Vice Ganda grew up in the neighbourhood Sta Cruz, Manila. His father, a native of Taysan, Batangas and a barangay captain in Tondo, Manila, was murdered when he was young, prompting his mother, an Ilocana from San Juan, La Union, to leave her children to work abroad as a caregiver. Ganda was able to sustain his studies due to a scholarship granted by an unknown Japanese woman who funded his education from third grade until second year college. He studied political science at Far Eastern University but was not able to complete his studies to pursue his career.

Career

1997-2008: Stand-up comedy and cross-over to television and films
Vice Ganda started out as a singer, then as a comedian for Punchline and The Library in Manila, whose owner Andrew de Real gave him the stage name "Vice Ganda". He was discovered by Hans Mortel who later on introduced him to De Real, the "Godfather of Malate" and "King of Comedy Bars" who had served as his mentor for his comedy skits. There he spent several years developing his material in the comedy clubs. His career began to build after appearances on television and reviews from tabloid columns.

He works alongside fellow comedians Chokoleit, Pooh, John Lapus and Rey Kilay. Ganda is widely known for his observational comedy and situational irony type of comedy skits. In 1999, a talent scout and now a fellow television comedian and manager Ogie Diaz discovered Ganda in one of his visits to the comedy bars. 

He appeared first as Antonia in the Judy Ann Drama Special aired by giant television network ABS-CBN. He also appeared on a cameo role in Sa Paraiso ni Efren, a film produced by Regal Films. In the same year, Ganda appeared as one of the guests for Comedy Central Market under GMA Network and became a guest performer for a now defunct show, SOP in the same network. In 2002, he was one of the contenders in “O Diva” and "Birit Queen", both singing contests in Eat Bulaga!, the longest-running noontime show in the Philippines. Since then, he played minor roles or guest roles in various television programs of ABS-CBN such as M.R.S. (Most Requested Show) and various roles in a drama anthology, Maalaala Mo Kaya

In 2007, Ganda appeared on his biggest project at that time in Apat Dapat, Dapat Apat, a film under VIVA Films starring Candy Pangilinan, Eugene Domingo, Rufa Mae Quinto and Pokwang. During this time, he still performs as a stand-up comedian to make ends meet. In the same year, he starred as one of the supporting actors for a television series Kokey. In 2008, Ganda starred in minor role in an independent film Condo with Coco Martin, and in the same year in a Star Cinema film In My Life alongside Vilma Santos and John Lloyd Cruz. He then appeared in several television series and sitcoms such as Dyosa, under the direction of Wenn V. Deramas and in the drama series Maging Sino Ka Man: Ang Pagbabalik.

2009-2015: It's Showtime and rise to fame

Vice Ganda's biggest break was when he became part of It's Showtime, a talent search program of ABS-CBN premiered in October 2009. The role was refused by then comedian Long Mejia until he was offered to replace Mejia as an unelectable judge. With this career break through, Ganda's life story of being bullied as a young, closeted homosexual has also been featured in the drama anthology, Maalaala Mo Kaya. 

In 2010, he gained widespread popularity due to his jokes and sarcasm. He was one of the supporting roles for "Hating Kapatid" alongside Judy Ann Santos and Sarah Geronimo. In the same year, he starred in his first ever feature film, a remake of the 1988 comedy film, Petrang Kabayo, originally played by Roderick Paulate. The film was an instant hit at its release and became one of the best-selling Filipino film of 2010. In the same year, Ganda staged his first ever major concert titled as "May Nag-Text.. 'Yung Totoo! Vice Ganda sa Araneta" held at the Araneta Coliseum.

In 2011, He became host of his own Sunday talk show, Gandang Gabi, Vice!, which ended in 2020. In the same year, he won the Bert Marcelo Achievement Award for Excellence in Comedy at the 2011 GMMSF Box-Office Entertainment Awards. He also appeared on various guest roles for television series, Your Song, 100 Days to Heaven and I Dare You. Ganda then launched his successful 2nd major concert at the Araneta Coliseum, a sold-out event called "Eto Na: Vice Ganda, Todong Sample sa Araneta".

In 2012, he top-billed the film The Unkabogable Praybeyt Benjamin, with Derek Ramsay, directed by Wenn V. Deramas. The movie became the first local film to reach 300 million pesos in ticket sales, and proved to be an even greater box office success than Petrang Kabayo. Ganda also starred in the Filipino comedy film This Guy's in Love with U Mare! under Star Cinema and Viva Films, alongside Luis Manzano and Toni Gonzaga, directed by Deramas. Ganda appeared on his first ever Metro Manila Film Festival entry, Sisterakas, a Filipino comedy parody film produced by Star Cinema and Viva Films in 2012 along with Kris Aquino and Ai-Ai de las Alas. The film became the highest-grossing Filipino film of 2012 and now the 3rd highest-grossing Filipino film of all time.

In 2013, he starred in another hit movie alongside Maricel Soriano called Girl, Boy, Bakla, Tomboy, an official entry of the 2013 Metro Manila Film Festival. The movie earned Ganda a Best Actor nomination at the MMFF and earned him Movie Actor Of The Year award at the 2014 Philippine Movie Press Club Star Awards for Movies (PMPC). In the same year, Ganda had his 3rd major concert called "I-Vice Ganda Mo Ko sa Araneta", a live concert that sparked controversy with GMA News head journalist Jessica Soho.

In 2014, Star Cinema released a movie called The Amazing Praybeyt Benjamin an official entry for the 2014 Metro Manila Film Festival and a sequel of a 2011 film of the same title. Ganda participated alongside actress Alex Gonzaga, and actors Richard Yap and James "Bimby" Aquino-Yap. The film was directed by Wenn V. Deramas and became the highest grossing Filipino film of 2014.

In 2015, Star Cinema released Beauty and the Bestie, an official entry for the 2015 Metro Manila Film Festival, directed by Wenn V. Deramas. Ganda starred alongside actors Coco Martin, James Reid and Nadine Lustre. The film ended up as the highest-grossing Filipino film of 2015.

2016-present: Critical success and recent projects
In 2016, Ganda starred in an action comedy film The Super Parental Guardians with Coco Martin. The film is directed by Joyce Bernal and is under the production of Star Cinema. This marks Ganda's 3rd consecutive highest-grossing film as it topped the 2016 year-end box office gross in Philippine cinema. In the same year, he became judge in the 5th and 6th seasons of Pilipinas Got Talent, along with his fellow celebrities, Angel Locsin and Robin Padilla and in Pinoy Boyband Superstar with Aga Muhlach, Yeng Constantino and 2NE1 member Sandara Park.

In 2017, he starred in another Metro Manila Film Festival entry titled Gandarrapiddo: The Revenger Squad alongside Daniel Padilla and 2015 Miss Universe Pia Wurtzbach. The film marks Ganda's 4th consecutive highest-grossing film of the year. Aside from his film, he also staged two major concerts in the same year, the first is the sold-out concert "Pusuan Mo si Vice Ganda sa Araneta" which further added few shows in the United States particularly in Houston, Texas, Kissimmee, Florida, San Diego and Los Angeles in California, and the second being the grand launch concert of his own make-up brand, Vice Cosmetics titled as "Vice Ganda For All".

In 2018, he starred in Fantastica, a 2018 Filipino fantasy comedy film directed by Barry Gonzales and an official entry to the yearly Metro Manila Film Festival. It stars an ensemble cast including Bela Padilla, Richard Gutierrez and Dingdong Dantes. The film became the 2nd highest-grossing Filipino film of 2018 and 5th on the highest-grossing Filipino film of all time.

In 2019, Ganda together with Anne Curtis top-billed the 2019 Metro Manila Film Festival entry, The Mall, The Merrier. This was the first time that he did not top the box-office of the said film festival and ended up on a 2nd place behind Miracle in Cell No. 7. Ganda also staged his first ever duo concert with Asia's Songbird Regine Velasquez titled as "The Songbird and the Song Horse" at the Araneta Coliseum. The concert was a major success and had a run for three consecutive shows on February 14–16, 2019.

In June 2021, he hosted a game show, Everybody, Sing!, which replaced his own talk show Gandang Gabi, Vice!, the game show concluded in October 2021, then returned to television for its 2nd season in September 2022.The show made Ganda the first Filipino to win Best Lifestyle, Entertainment Presenter/Host in the fourth Asian Academy Creative Awards (AACA). Due to the restrictions brought upon by the COVID pandemic, he launched his first ever digital pay-per-view concert "Gandemic: The VG-tal Concert" in Sky Cable. After few months, with the easing of restrictions, Ganda returned to live stage with his concert "Vax Ganda: A Dose Of Laughter" at Pechanga Resort & Casino in Temecula, California and in Mohegan Sun in Connecticut.

On 2022, Ganda returned to movies through 2022 Metro Manila Film Festival entry Partners in Crime under Star Cinema alongside vlogger Ivana Alawi which ended up as the second-highest grossing entry of the said film festivalThe film was later on screened in Saitama and Nagoya, Japan in February 2023.Ganda pushed her success further as she won numerous awards such as "Most Outstanding Twitter Influencer", "Most Outstanding Social Media Personality", "Most Influential Multimedia Filipino Celebrity", and "Most Outstanding Entertainment Show Host" at the 5th Gawad Lasallianeta held at the De La Salle Araneta University. Ganda also won "Best Variety Show Host" at the 2023 Platinum Stallion National Media Awards of Trinity University of Asia. She renewed her contract with ABS-CBN on 2023 and announce series of concert shows in Canada and USA.

Other ventures

Music
In 2011, Vice Ganda  released his first studio album, Lakas Tama under Vicor Music. It features mostly pop and novelty songs, including his lead single "Palong Palo", written by Callalily frontman Kean Cipriano. In the same year, he was also included in the compilation album of Showtime, released by Star Records.

In 2013, he released his self-titled album under Star Records. Ganda's carrier single "Karakaraka" featuring  Filipino rapper Smugglaz quickly reached the top spot of the most-downloaded songs in the online musical portal MyMusicStore on the first day of its release. The hit single was used as theme song of the 2013 romantic-comedy Star Cinema film “Bromance: My Brother's Romance.” In 2014, Vice Ganda released his 3rd album, entitled #Trending, which featured the song Boom Panes and Push Mo Yan Teh!. The album reached gold record status with more than 7,500 copies sold in its first week according to the Philippine Association of the Record Industry, Inc. (PARI). The album featured songs that speak about social issues including gender inequality and corruption.

In 2015, Ganda released his single "Wag Kang Pabebe" with a music video released on July of the same year. He also released "Eh di Wow" as official soundtrack for Inday Bote and a cover of Jolina Magdangal's Chuva Choo Choo as a soundtrack for his film, Beauty and the Bestie. In 2016, Ganda released the sound track for his film The Super Parental Guardians, titled as "Ang Kulit", an original composition under Star Records. The song was composed by Jonathan Manalo in which Ganda expressed his gratitude to him for making the single along with his previous hits like "Wag kang Pabebe" and "Boom Panes" during Manalo's show at the Music Museum. In 2017, Ganda released his ballad single "Hanggang Kailan Aasa" and his pop single "Gigil si Aquo". The following year, he released "Ganda for All", a non-album single and "Kay Sayang Pasko Na Naman" in 2019.

Book
On July 16, 2016, Vice Ganda launched his first book titled President Vice: Ang Bagong Panggulo ng Pilipinas, a parody about how he would deal with problems of the Filipinos in case he was elected the next president of the Philippines. As of 2017, the book has already sold more than 100,000 copies in the Philippines.

Cosmetics
On October 7, 2017, Ganda launched "Vice Cosmetics", his own brand of cosmetics. In an interview by Rappler during his successful Meet-and-Greet at TriNoma store, he said that the idea to start his own makeup company started when he was offered to endorse a cosmetics line. His products from Vice Cosmetics are all designed and made in Los Angeles. In line with the launch, a concert named "Ganda For All" was held at the Smart Araneta Coliseum with various performers including its first ever celebrity endorsers, Maymay Entrata and Kisses Delavin. During the event, Vice Cosmetics earns Guinness World Record after 6,900 people applied lipstick at the same time surpassing the record  of MaryKay Cosmetics in China with previous record of 5,840.

Personal life

Vice Ganda does not mind being addressed with either masculine or feminine pronouns, identifying as non-binary. He has advocated for queer rights and representation throughout his career.

Vice Ganda reportedly suffered from depression due to career issues and personal problems. One of his biggest life inspirations is his teacher who told him to "always follow his dreams no matter how big or wild they are." Since November 2018, he has been in a relationship with Ion Perez, a member of the supporting cast on It's Showtime. On his YouTube vlog uploaded on February 13, 2022, he revealed that he and Perez underwent a commitment ceremony on October 19, 2021, at The Little Vegas Chapel in Las Vegas, Nevada.

Politics
Vice Ganda endorsed Davao City mayor Rodrigo Duterte for president, during the 2016 Philippine elections, and has had him on as a guest for his late-night television show Gandang Gabi, Vice!. For the 2022 Philippine elections, he endorsed Vice President Leni Robredo for president, stating that "Tayo dapat ang manalo. Si Leni Robredo ang magpapanalo sa atin. Ang tagal-tagal na natin talo. Ipanalo naman natin ang isa’t-isa. (We should win. Leni Robredo will make us win. We’ve been losing for so long. Let’s make each other win)." At Robredo's miting de avance (final rally before election day), he also endorsed Senator Kiko Pangilinan for vice president.

Philanthropy
In 2013, Vice Ganda auctioned off some of his clothing and performed for a fundraising comedy show and donated all proceeds to ABS-CBN's Sagip Kapamilya (Save a Family) relief operations for those affected by Super Typhoon Yolanda, one of the deadliest and most powerful tropical cyclones ever recorded.  He also joined a charity basketball game organized by fellow celebrities and PBA players held at Ynares Sports Arena in Pasig City to raise funds for families affected particularly in the Visayas region. 

In 2020, during the peak of COVID-19 pandemic in the Philippines, Ganda donated face masks, disposable gloves, safety goggles, alcohol, and disinfectant spray for use by health workers in various hospitals in the Philippines. Apart from his extensive donation campaign for medical frontliners, Ganda also provided financial assistance to more than 400 employees of his cosmetics company. Ganda also launched his post-birthday donation drive for two barangays in Quezon City wherein he handed relief packs containing canned goods, rice, noodles, soaps, among others to 850 families in Brgy. South Triangle and Brgy. Paligsahan. 

Ganda was among the performers that appeared in "Pantawid ng Pag-ibig: At Home Together Concert"..He launched his single "Corona Bye-Bye Na" during the live telecast. The show aimed to as a fundraiser for basic necessities for those affected by the pandemic. Ganda also partnered with Angel Locsin to provide beds in a temporary air-conditioned sleeping tents for medical staffs and other essential workers of Taguig City.

In August 2021 episode of his show, Everybody Sing! wherein the contestants are mountaineers and hikers, Ganda added donation to the  Bourne to Hike Mountaineers' beneficiaries- the Aeta communities in Bicol region. In November 2021, he donated his a day-worth of talent fee to ABS-CBN Foundation for the benefits of the victims of Typhoon Odette  in Cebu and Siargao. Ganda announced this during It's Showtime live telecast influencing his fellow hosts to donate their talent fees as well.

In November 2021, during the annual "Magpasikat" competition of It's Showtime hosts against each other. The said foundation caters to COVID and Non COVID cases and help them with medical care.

In January 2022, he donated  to a 10-day benefit concert headed by Regine Velasquez in the "Tulung-Tulong sa Pag-ahon campaign" of ABS-CBN Foundation to aid further recovery of typhoon Odette-affected families. In March 2022, in a vlog uploaded in his YouTube account, Ganda extended help to random strangers by paying for the medicines they bought in a pharmacy opposite AFP Medical Center in Quezon City. According to him, finding the money to buy medicine is a big headache for a lot of people so he paid for the expenses of all customers throughout the day.

Public reception

Cultural impact
As cited by Bautista (2012), researchers from University of San Jose - Recoletos studied the role of sarcasm and criticism on Filipino humor. Half of 100 participants stated that they gain more confidence from mimicking Vice Ganda's style of humor, while 64% of the respondents said that they usually imitate Vice Ganda's sarcasm during conversations. 

In a separate study by Centro Escolar University and Western Mindanao State University titled as "THE PRAGMATICS OF IRONY IN HUMOR: EMERGING DRIFTS IN PHILIPPINE WITTICISM" conducted by Richard M. Rillo and Junette B. Buslon, they have concluded that Ganda's irony in conversational witticisms to appear humorous greatly influenced today's Filipinos to use these strategies in their humorous remarks. They further stated that it is quite unfortunate to think that even children are into this kind of humor when they talk to others of their age, or even to people older than they. The research study stated that this may have been caused by the popularity of Vice Ganda in the different forms of media that the modern Filipinos have access to (e.g. TV; internet).

Ganda is considered a self-made individual and became an icon for Filipinos who work hard and dream big.Ganda's popularity in the Philippines became vital as he significantly influenced the normalisations of gay discussions in the mainstream media.  He is an advocate and a stalwart for the LGBT movement, to seek equal opportunities to the members of the LGBT in the Philippines. He fully supports and endorses the SOGIE Equality Bill or The Sexual Orientation and Gender Identity Expression (SOGIE, Tagalog: ['sɔdʒi]) Equality Bill, also known as the Anti-Discrimination Bill (ADB), a series of House and Senate bills that were introduced in the 17th and 18th Congress of the Philippines. 

The support draw inspiration from him, being an openly gay comedian — in an industry where straight actors are often discouraged or criticized for doing gay roles — to attain that level of success he has acquired in show business. On October 15, 2018, episode of It's Showtime, Ganda expressed during the live telecast:

"Alam mo ‘yang mga lalake akala niyo lagi eh ang sama ng iniisip sa mga bakla. Kahit sa CR, kaya ako hindi ako nag c-CR sa CR ng lalake na-b-bwisit ako. Yung pagpasok mo, pag may pumasok na bakla, yung mga umiihing mga lalake(acted out a dodging  gesture). (You know, all these men, they all think bad about gay men [who enter male restrooms]. That’s why I do not use male restrooms, I get annoyed. When a gay man enters a male restroom, men who are in there urinating [move away, as if evading something].)"[...]‘di ba sa CR din ng babae ‘di rin naman ako makapasok. Eh ‘yung ibang mga babae magrereklamo, ‘Ano ba yan kalalaking tao dito mag c-CR (I cannot enter women’s restrooms too. Some women complain, “What’s that? Why is a man using this CR?)..."

Ganda then called out and plead to Philippine Senators Joel Villanueva and Tito Sotto, to already pass that bill. Further pushing his advocacy, he graced the cover of Mega Magazine in 2018 and 2020 and became the first LGBT member in history to be in the front page. According to Mega founder Sari Yap, she wanted to showcase that the publication is not just for women. She further stated, "...it was decided to end it with inclusivity, proving that MEGA is not only for women, but for the LGBTQ community as well." She also discussed how that very community deserves its moment in the sun, which is why there was no other name on the list to front the issue but Vice Ganda.In 2022, Ganda launched his first "UnkabogaBALL", a ball to showcase fashion for the LGBT community in show business. The ball marked the start of a relationship between entertainers and content creators in the LGBTQ+ community.

Controversies
Gang rape jokes against Jessica Soho. In May 2013, Vice Ganda was widely criticized for making several jokes about gang rape during his I-Vice Ganda Mo Ko! comedy concert show. One of them was directed towards respected news anchor Jessica Soho, whom he mentioned in a joke regarding several personalities starring in a hypothetical pornographic film. Philippine women's rights group GABRIELA condemned the joke as being distasteful in light of rape victims. GMA reporter Arnold Clavio, a colleague of Soho, defended the news anchor and expressed his disapproval of Vice Ganda's body-shaming remark in one of the former's radio programs. Although Vice Ganda initially defended his stance, saying that the brand of humor he uses is based on his roots doing stand-up in comedy bars and karaoke lounges, the comedian issued an apology over the issue during an episode of It's Showtime.
Nora Aunor. Actress Nora Aunor also took umbrage at Vice Ganda's style of humor when she pulled out of her appearance as a special guest judge for the Tawag ng Tanghalan grand finals at the last minute. Aunor believed Vice Ganda's brand of insult comedy was against her moral beliefs, and was perturbed with the idea of being on the show alongside Vice Ganda.
Apollo Quiboloy. On one of his daily comedic discussions following a performance by Gian Magdangal on Tawag ng Tanghalan: Celebrity Champions, Vice Ganda made a joke after the founder of Kingdom of Jesus Christ, Pastor Apollo Quiboloy, among other claims of being responsible for stopping calamities, claimed that he was responsible for stopping the earthquakes in Mindanao. Vice Ganda jokingly challenged Pastor Quiboloy to stop one of the longest running and undying ABS-CBN television series, Ang Probinsyano and the common Philippine problem which is the constant traffic on EDSA. Members of the Kingdom of Jesus Christ took offense and expressed their dismay for Vice Ganda. Radio broadcaster and SMNI anchor, Mike Abe, a friend of Quiboloy, defended the founder and launched his foul-mouthed tirade on Vice Ganda about the controversial "stop" joke on Quiboloy. Two days after the joke, Quiboloy instead threatened that he will not only stop FPJ's Ang Probinsyano and shut down ABS-CBN as a whole within 4 months. Before saying these threats by Quiboloy, however, the company's contract, originally expiring on March 30, 2020, ended on May 4, 2020, based on Justice Secretary Menardo Guevarra's speech during the Senate hearing on alleged violations made by ABS-CBN. Two weeks after the shutdown of ABS-CBN, Quiboloy delivered the message to Vice Ganda on his show, Powerline, that he prophesied the network and Ang Probinsyano's end. However, the show (Ang Probinsyano) and all ABS-CBN shows and programs are still ongoing on other TV stations and social media platforms.
Rodante Marcoleta. On May 26, during the first hearing of ABS-CBN's new 25-year franchise, Sagip Partylist Representative and Deputy Speaker Rodante Marcoleta presented videos showing Vice Ganda jokingly asking Pastor Apollo Quiboloy of the Restorationist church Kingdom of Jesus Christ to stop Ang Probinsyano. Marcoleta alleged that Vice Ganda's statement was meant sincerely, and that the challenge was accepted. Vice Ganda responded to Marcoleta via a Twitter post, claiming that it was a joke.

Filmography

Discography

Studio albums

Compilation albums

Extended plays

Singles
{| class="wikitable plainrowheaders"
|-
! Year !! Title !! Album
|-	
| rowspan=2| 2013
| KaraKaraka 
| style="text-align:center|Vice Ganda and Karakaraka (Dance EP)
|-
| Whoops Kirri 
|  style="text-align:center|Girl, Boy, Bakla, Tomboy Official Soundtrack
|-
| rowspan=2| 2014
| Boompanes
| rowspan=2  style="text-align:center| #Trending
|-
| Push Mo Yan Te 
|-
| rowspan=3|2015
| Eh di wow! 
|  style="text-align:center|Inday Bote Official Soundtrack
|-
| Wag Kang Pabebe| 
|-
| Chuva Choo Choo 
|  style="text-align:center|Beauty and the Bestie Official Soundtrack|-
| rowspan="2"|2016
| Pasa Diyos 
| 
|-
| Ang Kulit|  style="text-align:center|The Super Parental Guardians Official Soundtrack|-
| rowspan=2|2017
| Hanggang Kailan Aasa| 
|-
| Gigil si Aquo 
|  style="text-align:center|Gandarrapido: The Revenger Squad Official Soundtrack|-
| 2018
| Ganda for All| 
|-
| 2019
| Kay Sayang Pasko Na Naman 
|  style="text-align:center|The Mall, The Merrier Official Soundtrack|-
| rowspan="2"|2020
| Corona Ba-Bye Na!| 
|-
|Mahal Ako Ng Mahal Ko| 
|-
| 2021
|Higad Girl| 
|-
| 2022
|Look at Me Now| 
|}

Concerts

Headlining concerts
 May Nag-Text.. 'Yung Totoo! Vice Ganda sa Araneta (2010)
 Eto Na: Vice Ganda, Todong Sample sa Araneta (2011)
 I-Vice Ganda Mo Ako sa Araneta (2013)
 Vice Gandang Ganda Sa Sarili sa Araneta.. Eh Di Wow! (2015)
 Pusuan Mo Si Vice Ganda sa Araneta (2017)
 Vice Ganda For All Concert'' (2017)
 Vax Ganda: A Dose Of Laughter US Tour (2021)Co-headlining concerts The Songbird and The Song Horse (2019)Minor shows'''
 D'Vice Live (2002)
 DV3 (2003)
 V Day (2005)
 DIVAS LIVE Back to Back to Back (2006)
 Happy Vice Day (2007)

Awards and nominations

Notes

References

External links
 

1976 births
Filipino male television actors
Filipino television presenters
Filipino male comedians
Filipino television variety show hosts
Filipino television talk show hosts
Living people
Filipino gay actors
People from Tondo, Manila
Male actors from Manila
Far Eastern University alumni
Gay comedians
Gay singers
Viva Artists Agency
Tagalog people
Ilocano people
ABS-CBN personalities
Star Music artists
GMA Network personalities
Filipino gay musicians
Filipino male film actors
20th-century Filipino LGBT people
21st-century Filipino LGBT people
Filipino LGBT singers
Non-binary comedians